Jackie Noëlle Groenen (born 17 December 1994) is a Dutch professional footballer and former judoka who plays as a midfielder for Division 1 Féminine club Paris Saint-Germain and the Netherlands national team.

Groenen previously played for German clubs SGS Essen, FCR 2001 Duisburg and FFC Frankfurt, as well as for Chelsea in the English FA WSL. She was born in the Netherlands but grew up just over the Belgian border in Poppel. In 2014, FIFA ruled her ineligible to switch allegiance to Belgium, as she did not hold a Belgian passport when she played for the Netherlands at youth level.

Club career

Early career
Groenen and her sister, Merel, began playing football at Goirlese Sportvereniging Blauw-Wit. After VV Riel and Wilhelmina Boys, they moved to SV Rood-Wit Veldhoven. The sisters continued their football career in the Frauen-Bundesliga and became players for SGS Essen. Groenen made her debut for SGS Essen in the DFB-Pokal Cup on 30 January 2011 against Turbine Potsdam.

FCR 2001 Duisburg

Groenen played for FCR 2001 Duisburg from 2011, until their insolvency at the end of 2013. On 7 May 2011, Groenen made her debut for the club against USV Jena in the Bundesliga Cup, scoring the third goal in a 4–1 win. She made her league debut on 28 August 2011 in a 2–0 win over Hamburger SV.

Chelsea
In February 2014, Groenen signed for Chelsea. On 17 April, she made her FA WSL debut in a 2–0 win over Bristol City. On 13 July, Groenen scored her first goals, netting twice in a 13–0 victory against London Bees in the FA WSL Continental Cup.

FFC Frankfurt

She returned to Germany and signed for FFC Frankfurt in June 2015. On 5 September, Groenen made her debut for the club in a 1–0 win against 1899 Hoffenheim.

Manchester United
On 22 May 2019, it was announced Groenen had signed a contract with Manchester United ahead of the 2019–20 season. In doing so, she became the team's first overseas signing with the team having formed a year earlier consisting of all British players. Groenen made her debut for Manchester United against Manchester City in the FA WSL on 7 September 2019, a 1–0 loss in the inaugural Manchester derby.

Paris Saint-Germain
On 15 September 2022, French club Paris Saint-Germain announced the signing of Groenen on a three-year deal until June 2025.

International career
FIFA blocked Groenen's attempts to switch to representing Belgium because she did not have a Belgian passport when she played for the Netherlands' youth teams. She later indicated her willingness to play for the Netherlands again.

In January 2016, Groenen was called up to the Netherlands senior squad for the team's winter training camp in Turkey. She appeared in two friendly matches against Denmark to collect her first senior caps on 22 January 2016.

Groenen was part of the Dutch team that won the UEFA Women's Euro 2017. She played in all matches and was named in the 2017 UEFA Team of the Tournament.

In February 2018, Groenen was selected for the Netherlands side that won the 2018 Algarve Cup. Due to the final between Netherlands and Sweden being cancelled, caused by heavy rain and adverse weather conditions, the Algarve Cup was awarded to both teams.

In April 2019, Groenen was selected for her first World Cup. She started every game at the tournament and scored the only goal in extra-time of the 1–0 semi-final victory over Sweden to help the team reach their first World Cup final. The Netherlands eventually lost the final to the United States.

Judo
Groenen has won a series of championships in judo sports. In 2007, 2008 and 2009 she was Netherlands champion in the under 15 age group. She has won these titles in the weight class −32 kg. In 2010, she was vice champion in the weight class −44 kg. On 6 March 2010 she won the gold medal in the under 17 age group in Tilburg, Netherlands and on the European level at the European championships in June 2010 in Teplice she won the bronze medal of the under 17 age group, weight class −40 kg.
In February 2011 Groenen won the Netherlands junior (under 20 age group) championships in the weight class −44 kg.

Groenen's judo career came to an end when she was 17. Her employers FCR 2001 Duisburg made clear their unhappiness when she broke her hip in a judo accident the day before a football match. Groenen admitted that she preferred football and would eventually have chosen to stop judo in any case.

Personal life

While playing for Chelsea in London, Groenen was studying for a law degree at Tilburg University and the club would fly her to the Netherlands for her exams. Her older sister Merel used to play for Belgian women's football team Lierse SK.

Career statistics

Club

International

Scores and results list the Netherlands' goal tally first, score column indicates score after each Groenen goal.

Honours
Netherlands
 UEFA European Women's Championship: 2017
 Algarve Cup: 2018
FIFA Women's World Cup: runner-up 2019
 Tournoi de France: runner-up 2020
Individual
 UEFA European Women's Championship Team of the Tournament: 2017

References

External links

 Profile at Manchester United F.C.
 Profile at OnsOranje.nl 
 
 
 
 

1994 births
Living people
People from Ravels
Dutch female judoka
Footballers from Tilburg
Footballers from Antwerp Province
Women's association football midfielders
Dutch women's footballers
Netherlands women's international footballers
SGS Essen players
FCR 2001 Duisburg players
MSV Duisburg (women) players
Chelsea F.C. Women players
1. FFC Frankfurt players
Manchester United W.F.C. players
Paris Saint-Germain Féminine players
Frauen-Bundesliga players
Women's Super League players
UEFA Women's Championship-winning players
Knights of the Order of Orange-Nassau
2019 FIFA Women's World Cup players
Dutch expatriate women's footballers
Dutch expatriate sportspeople in Germany
Dutch expatriate sportspeople in England
Dutch expatriate sportspeople in France
Expatriate women's footballers in Germany
Expatriate women's footballers in England
Expatriate women's footballers in France
Footballers at the 2020 Summer Olympics
Olympic footballers of the Netherlands
UEFA Women's Euro 2022 players
UEFA Women's Euro 2017 players
21st-century Dutch women